Klimushino is a rural locality (a village) in Nizhne-Vazhskoye Rural Settlement, Verkhovazhsky District, Vologda Oblast, Russia. The population was 288 as of 2002. There are 4 streets.

Geography 
Klimushino is located 10 km northeast of Verkhovazhye (the district's administrative centre) by road. Vakhrushevo is the nearest rural locality.

References 

Rural localities in Verkhovazhsky District